One Take (also known as BNK48: One Take) is a 2020 documentary film directed Manatsanun Panlertwongskul. The premise revolves around the Thai girl group BNK48, and their preparations for the 6th Single Senbatsu General Election.

Release 
One Take is the second documentary that features BNK48, after BNK48: Girls Don't Cry in 2018. Originally, the working title was Real Me: BNK48 Documentary Season 2. One Take was originally going to be released on April 1, 2020  but was postponed due to the COVID-19 pandemic.

Synopsis 
One Take follow the members preparation before the group first General Election event, where the fans able to vote their members into the next line-up for the group 6th single. The film focusing on atmosphere of the members competition between the first and second members.

Cast 
 BNK48
 Nataphol Pavaravadhana, BNK48's general manager
 Nariaki Terada, Corporate officer of AKS
 Junji Yuasa, Representative Director of Sizuk Entertainment
 Triumphs Kingdom, singer
 Marie Eugenie Le Lay, Singer

Music 
The documentary includes the song "It's Life" sung by member Cherprang and "It's Me" by Suchaya Saenkhot. Both of the song was released on February 14 and included in group 7th single "77 no Suteki na Machi e - (77ดินแดนแสนวิเศษ)" Type-A version.

References

External links
 
 

2020 films
Netflix original documentary films
2020 documentary films
Thai documentary films